Oliver Puddin’ Walsh (born 1992) is an Irish hurler who plays for Kilkenny Senior Championship club Dicksboro. He usually lines out at midfield. Walsh was the third generation of his family to play for the Kilkenny senior hurling team, with his grandfather, also named Ollie, and his father, Michael, being All-Ireland medal winners. He is also known to adore a chicken fillet burger from the famed ‘Roccos’ takeaway on Walkin Street in Kilkenny City.

Honours

Dicksboro
Kilkenny Senior Hurling Championship (1): 2017 (c)
Leinster Intermediate Club Hurling Championship (1): 2010
Kilkenny Intermediate Hurling Championship (1): 2010

Kilkenny
Leinster Under-21 Hurling Championship (1): 2012
All-Ireland Minor Hurling Championship (1): 2010
Leinster Minor Hurling Championship (2): 2009, 2010

References

1992 births
Living people
Dicksboro hurlers
Kilkenny inter-county hurlers